This list of notable glider pilots contains the names of those who have achieved fame in gliding and in other fields:

Notable in gliding

 Ruth Alexander - female altitude record breaker, first woman glider instructor in the U.S.
 Sergei Anokhin - test pilot, Hero of the Soviet Union, glider instructor, recordsman and gliding promouter in the USSR and Turkey, on October 2, 1934, carried out a flutter test with deliberate in-flight destruction of RotFront-1 glider and safe parachute escape after the glider disintegration.
 Bill Bedford test pilot - first to fly Hawker P.1127  and Harrier.
 Luca Bertossio - Champion glider aerobatic pilot
 Paul Bikle - NASA director, glider altitude record setter and  Soaring Hall of Fame
 William Hawley Bowlus - first American to break Wright brothers' 1911 gliding record, designer of first military prototype glider the XCG-16A, superintendent of construction of the Spirit of St. Louis and U.S. Soaring Hall of Fame member

 Anne Burns - British champion, holder of multiple records, aerospace engineer
 Janusz Centka - multiple world champion
 Jackie Coogan - actor, former WW2-era combat Glider Pilot
 Adela Dankowska - held 12 world records and 43 Polish records during her career
 Anthony Deane-Drummond - major-general & British national champion
 Heini Dittmar - test pilot (first person over 1000 km/h) and gliding record breaker
 Wilhelm Düerkop - glider aerobatic champion
 Richard C. du Pont - director of military glider program
 Einar Enevoldson - test pilot and gliding record breaker
 Markus Feyerabend - glider aerobatics champion
 Steve Fossett - entrepreneur and gliding record breaker
Nicholas Goodhart - world champion, record breaker and inventor of the Mirror sight deck landing system
 Tadeusz Góra - gliding record breaker, first winner of the Lilienthal Gliding Medal
 Hans-Werner Grosse - 46 world records
 Doris Grove - female world record breaker, first woman to fly 1000 km, and U.S. Soaring Hall of Fame member 
 Julius Hatry - glider designer
 Barron Hilton - hotel magnate and founder of the Barron Hilton Cup for gliding
 Wolf Hirth - German gliding pioneer and sailplane designer
 Klaus Holighaus - glider designer and European Champion
 Hans Jacobs - glider designer
 Dick Johnson - 11-time U.S. National Champion, glider distance record setter and  Soaring Hall of Fame
 Sebastian Kawa - most wins (5+3) in World Gliding Championships
 Joachim Kuettner - atmospheric scientist and gliding record breaker
 Thomas Knauff - author, instructor, world record breaker, and U.S. Soaring Hall of Fame member 
 Robert Kronfeld - Austrian gliding champion and sailplane designer
 Jean-Marie Le Bris - pioneer of French aviation
 George Lee - three time world champion, ex-RAF
 Otto Lilienthal - German machine engineer, first controlled gliding flights to 250 m
 Paul MacCready - aviation inventor, devised the MacCready Theory on speed to fly 
 Edward Makula - world champion, 7 world records
 Jerzy Makula - six time world glider aerobatic champion 
 Peter Masak - U.S. Soaring Team member, developed the first practical winglets for sailplanes
 Mike Melvill - Spaceship One test pilot, first commercial astronaut 
 Willy Messerschmitt, aircraft designer, including gliders
 George Moffat - author, two-time world champion, and U.S. Soaring Hall of Fame member
 John J. Montgomery - U.S. physicist, first controlled glider flight in U.S., and U.S. Soaring Hall of Fame member
 Story Musgrave - astronaut on a Hubble Space Telescope repair mission, CFI-Glider
 Klaus Ohlmann - 36 world records, member of the Mountain Wave Project
 Derek Piggott - author, flight instructor and movie stunt pilot
 Joan Meakin Price - first woman to glide over the English Channel (1934).
 Helmut Reichmann - German professor, author and three-time gliding world champion
 Hanna Reitsch - test pilot and breaker of several gliding records
 Ingo Renner - four time world champion, two world records, flight instructor
 Peter Riedel - gliding champion
 Cliff Robertson - actor and soaring activist
 Martin Schempp - glider designer and pilot
 Richard Schreder - naval aviator and developer of the HP/RS-series kit sailplanes marketed from 1962 until about 1982.
 Peter Scott - naturalist (founder of World Wildlife Fund and ex-chairman of British Gliding Association)
 Wally Scott - world record breaker, U.S. Soaring Hall of Fame member, and multi-time recipient of the Lewin B. Barringer Memorial Trophy
 Geoffrey H. Stephenson - first person to cross the English Channel in a glider
 Karl Striedieck - world record breaker, and U.S. Soaring Hall of Fame member 
 Wolfgang Späte - Inventor of the theory of speed to fly, Luftwaffe ace and test pilot 
 Kurt Student - Luftwaffe general, developed glider infantry concept, commanded WW2-era Fallschirmjäger
 Dennis Tito - gliding speed record holder, aerospace engineer and investment manager
 Oskar Ursinus - gliding pioneer and designer
 Gerhard Waibel - glider pilot and designer
 Ann Welch - instructor and administrator
 Philip Wills - world champion and administrator
 Wright Brothers - early glider pioneers, invented 3-axis flight control on 1902 glider, set world glider duration record in 1911 (also widely credited with inventing the airplane)
 Jan Wróblewski - World Champion in 1965 and 1972; FAI Lilienthal Medal 1972

Other notable people known to have flown gliders
 Sir John Allison - RAF Officer, former Commander in Chief Strike Command
 James Allison - F1 Engineer, Technical Director Scuderia Ferrari
 Neil Armstrong - first man on the moon, astronaut
 Richard Bach - author
 Wernher von Braun - American-German aerospace engineer
 Paul Bulcke - Nestlé CEO (2007–present)
 Barbara Cartland - author
 Kalpana Chawla - astronaut
 John Denver - singer/songwriter
 Hugh Downs - television news anchor
 Norman Foster, Baron Foster of Thames Bank - British architect
 Matthew Fox - actor
 Christopher Foyle - owner of Foyles Bookshop
 Andy Green - World Land Speed Record holder
 Erich Hartmann - most successful fighter pilot of all times (352 confirmed victories)
 Will Hay - British comic actor
 Ralph Hooper - British aeronautical engineer famous for the Hawker Siddeley Harrier and BAe Hawk
 L. Ron Hubbard - founder of the Church of Scientology
 Marsha Ivins - astronaut
 Sir David Jason - actor
 Amy Johnson - pioneer in aviation, member at Yorkshire Gliding Club from 1937 
 John Kerry - U.S. Senator and former presidential candidate
 Sergei Korolev - father of the Soviet space program
 Charles Lindbergh - winner of the Orteig Prize as pilot on first solo nonstop Atlantic crossing flight 
 William S. McArthur - astronaut
Richie McCaw - former All Blacks captain 
 Steve McQueen - actor, star of The Thomas Crown Affair (1968 film)
 Arseny Mironov - Russian aerospace engineer and aviator, scientist in aircraft aerodynamics and flight testing
 James H. Newman - astronaut, holds private pilot certificate (glider)
 Sir Paul Nurse - President of the Royal Society
 Robert Pearson - airline pilot and glider pilot who glided a Boeing 767 to safety
 Christopher Reeve - actor
 Michel Rocard - French former prime minister.
 Martin Shaw - actor
 Alan Shepard - astronaut on first Project Mercury space flight
 Chesley Sullenberger - captain of US Airways Flight 1549 which ditched in the Hudson River
 Peter Twiss - test pilot and former holder of the World Air Speed Record

References

Gliding

Glider pilots